Ján Plch (born 16 August 1974) is a Slovak professional ice hockey player.

He played with HC Slovan Bratislava in the Slovak Extraliga.

Career statistics

Regular season and playoffs

International

References

External links

1974 births
Living people
HC Slovan Bratislava players
Dauphins d'Épinal players
Slovak ice hockey right wingers
Sportspeople from Liptovský Mikuláš
Slovak expatriate ice hockey players in the Czech Republic
Expatriate ice hockey players in France
Slovak expatriate sportspeople in France